Younes Nazarian (January 26, 1931  March 18, 2022) was a Jewish Iranian-American businessman, investor, and philanthropist. An early investor in Qualcomm, he was the Chairman of Nazarian Enterprises. He was also a major donor to charitable causes in California and Israel.

Early life
Younes Nazarian was born in Iran on January 26, 1931, the son of Golbahar and Davoud Nazarian. His father died when he was three years old. After losing his fortune amassed as a construction contractor during the Iranian Revolution of 1979, he immigrated to the United States with his brother Izak Parviz Nazarian, settling in Beverly Hills, California.

Career
Upon arriving in the United States in 1980, Younes Nazarian's entrepreneurial acumen led him to become co-owner of Stadco, a tool and die manufacturing company in the aerospace industry.  He bought into Omninet, a technology company that had developed a wireless protocol that enabled trucking companies to keep track of their vehicles. By recognizing its potential, he presented the technology to Qualcomm founder Irwin M. Jacobs who offered Nazarian a major stake in Qualcomm in exchange for Omninet. As an early investor, he served on the Board of Directors of San Diego-based Qualcomm, a leader in wireless telecommunications, R&D, and the largest fabless chip supplier in the world.

Younes Nazarian was the Chairman of Nazarian Enterprises which focuses on the diversification of assets across a variety of interests in the private, public, and real estate markets. Key industries include aerospace, manufacturing and logistics, technology, hospitality, and alternative energy, among others. He also served as the secretary of the board of directors of ANG, Inc., a manufacturer of military products headquartered in Manchester, New Hampshire.

Philanthropy
Younes Nazarian was the founder of the Younes & Soraya Nazarian Family Foundation and its Israeli sister organization, the Ima Foundation. His daughter, Dr. Sharon Nazarian, serves as the foundation's President.

Younes Nazarian was the former chairman of the board of governors of the Jerusalem Academy of Music and Dance and the Haifa Foundation.[3]  He served on the board of directors of the Sapir Academic College, where the Younes & Soraya Nazarian Academic Library is named in his honor. The Younes and Soraya Nazarian Pre-Academic Library Of the Ima Foundation at the Hebrew University of Jerusalem is also named in his honor.

In 2007, he donated $119,000 to the University of Haifa in the form of 119 scholarships of $1,000 to commemorate the Israeli casualties of the 2006 Lebanon War. That same year, he received an Honorary Doctorate of Philosophy from the university. Additionally, he served as a member of the "Public Standing from abroad" on its board of governors. In mid 2017, Younes donated $17,000,000 to the Valley Performing Arts Center at California State University, Northridge. The performing arts center will have a name change in honor of Younes' wife, Soraya (it will also be known as "The Soraya").

Younes Nazarian endowed the Beit Midrash Fellowship at the Milken Community High School in Bel Air. He has also endowed the Younes & Soraya Nazarian Center for Israel Studies at the University of California, Los Angeles (UCLA). The Nazarian Pavilion in the Doheny Library on the campus of the University of Southern California (USC) was also built as a result of a charitable gift from Nazarian. In 2017, Nazarian and his wife donated $17 million to the California State University, Northridge, where the Valley Performing Arts Centre was renamed the Younes and Soraya Nazarian Center for the Performing Arts.

Younes Nazarian was the former chairman of the Habib Levy Cultural & Educational Foundation. He served on the board of trustees of the Jewish Federation and Jewish Television Network. He has served at the Sinai Temple, a Conservative synagogue in Westwood.

Younes Nazarian served on the Advisory Board of the Center for Middle East Public Policy at the RAND Corporation.  He served on the board of directors for the Friends of IDF, a fundraising non-profit organization for the Israel Defense Forces.

Younes Nazarian obtained honorary doctorate degrees from the University of Haifa and California State University, Northridge, where the performing arts center is named in their honor.

Younes Nazarian received Israel's highest honor of the Torch Lighting Ceremony on Mount Hertzl, generally only given to Israeli-born citizens, and was also the recipient of the 2011 Ellis Island Medal of Honor.

Personal life
Younes Nazarian was married to Soraya Sarah Nazarian, for 61 years. They have four children David Nazarian, Shulamit Nazarian, Dr. Sharon Nazarian, and Sam Nazarian. Additional family members include daughters-in-law Angella Nazarian and Emina Cunmulaj Nazarian, sons-in-law Fernando Flint and Matt Oshinski.

Younes and Soraya Sarah Nazarian have eleven grandchildren Ariel, Aaron, Phillip, Elan, Sarah, Eli, Layla, Adam, Ella, Mia, Sha; and great-grandson Lev.

Death
Nazarian died on March 18, 2022, at his home in Los Angeles, California, at the age of 91.

References

External links
The Younes & Soraya Nazarian Center for Israel Studies at UCLA
The Younes and Soraya Pre-Academic Library of the Ima Foundation at the Hebrew University of Jerusalem
The Y&S Nazarian Family Foundation
Ima Foundation

1931 births
2022 deaths
American billionaires
American company founders
American construction businesspeople
American investors
American manufacturing businesspeople
American people of Iranian-Jewish descent
American transportation businesspeople
American venture capitalists
Businesspeople from Los Angeles
Conservative Jews
Iranian emigrants to the United States
Iranian Jews
Iranian philanthropists
Jewish American philanthropists
Younes
People from Beverly Hills, California
People from Tehran
Philanthropists from California
RAND Corporation people
University of California, Los Angeles people
Exiles of the Iranian Revolution in the United States